Hamada Jambay (born 25 April 1975) is a football manager and former professional player who played for as a right-back in the French Ligue 1 and Ligue 2. He is best known for his stint at Olympique de Marseille throughout the 1990s. Born in Comoros, Jambay grew up in France and represented Madagascar internationally.

Club career
Jambay debuted for Marseille in 1993 in the Ligue 1 and stayed with the team throughout their stint in the Ligue 2 from 1994 to 1996. He helped the team get promoted back to the Ligue 1, and was a pillar for the team famous for his occasional wondergoal.

After Marseille, he had spells with Toulouse FC and CS Sedan Ardennes. He retired in 2005, returning to Comoros where he became a businessman. He also coached his hometown team Djabal Club d'Iconi and helped them win their only Comoros Premier League title.

International career
Jambay was born in Comoros and is of Malagasy descent through his mother. Raised in France, Jambay was originally a youth international for France. He chose to represent the Madagascar national team and represtend them from 2003 to 2007. He made his debut for Madagascar in a 3–1 loss against Algeria on 24 April 2003 in friendly game.

Personal life
After retirement, Jambay had a stadium named after him in the Busserine district in Marseille, where he grew up.

Honours
Marseille
 Ligue 2: 1994–95

External links
 
 L'OM 1899 Profile
 
 France Football Profile

References

1975 births
Living people
People from Grande Comore
Comorian people of Malagasy descent
Immigrants to France
Naturalized citizens of France
French sportspeople of Comorian descent
French sportspeople of Malagasy descent
People with acquired Malagasy citizenship
Malagasy people of Comorian descent
Comorian footballers
French footballers
Malagasy footballers
Association football defenders
Olympique de Marseille players
Toulouse FC players
CS Sedan Ardennes players
Ligue 1 players
Ligue 2 players
France youth international footballers
Madagascar international footballers
Comorian football managers
French football managers
Malagasy football managers